The following is an incomplete list of association football clubs based in Zambia.
For a complete list see :Category:Football clubs in Zambia

B
Buildcon F.C (Ndola)

C
Chambishi F.C.
Choma Eagles (Choma)
City of Lusaka (Lusaka)

F
Forest Rangers (Ndola)

G
Green Buffaloes (Lusaka)
Green Eagles (Choma)

I
Indeni (Ndola)

K
Kabwe Warriors (Kabwe)
Kalewa (Ndola)
Kalulushi Modern Stars
Kitwe United F.C.
Konkola Blades (Chililabombwe)
Konkola Mine Police (Chililabombwe)
Kashikishi Warriors F.C. (Nchelenge)

L
Lime Hotspurs (Ndola)
Lumwana Radiants (Solwezi)
Lusaka Dynamos (Lusaka)

M
Mufulira Wanderers F.C.
Malaiti Rangers F.C.

N
Nakambala Leopards
NAPSA Stars (Kabwe)
National Assembly (Lusaka)
Nchanga Rangers (Chingola)
Nkana F.C (Kitwe)
Nkwazi (Lusaka)

P
Power Dynamos (Kitwe)

R
Red Arrows (Lusaka)
Roan United (Luanshya)

Y
Young Arrows F.C.

Z
Zanaco (Lusaka)
ZESCO United (Ndola)
Zamtel (Ndola)
Zambeef (Chisamba)

 
Zambia
Football clubs
Football clubs